ES engine may refer to:

 V6 ESL engine, an automotive engine developed by PSA Group (Peugeot and Citroën) and Renault
 Engine for Lexus ES, a car series
 ES engine, a type of Honda E engine
 JavaScript engine, web browser scripting engine
 Engine for OpenGL ES

See also
 ES (disambiguation)